Sougueur is a town and commune in Tiaret Province in north-western Algeria.

Communes of Tiaret Province
Algeria
Cities in Algeria